Rafael Alexandre Fernandes Ferreira da Silva  (born 17 May 1993) is a Portuguese footballer who plays as an attacking midfielder or winger for Primeira Liga club Benfica.

After starting his professional career at Feirense, he transferred to Braga in 2013 and went on to make 127 appearances for them, scoring 26 goals winning the Taça de Portugal in 2016. He joined Benfica that year for €16.4 million, winning two Primeira Liga championships and another cup during his spell.

A full international from 2014 to 2021, Silva represented Portugal on 25 occasions. He was selected for the 2014 FIFA World Cup, UEFA Euro 2016, the 2019 UEFA Nations League Finals and UEFA Euro 2020, winning the 2016 and 2019 tournaments.

Club career

Feirense
Born in Vila Franca de Xira, Silva grew up in Forte da Casa and started playing football with U.A. Povoense and F.C. Alverca, both in the Lisbon District. In 2011, aged 18, he signed with C.D. Feirense with which he played his last year as a junior.

Silva made his professional debut on 29 July 2012, playing the full 90 minutes in a 2–1 home win against F.C. Penafiel for the season's Taça da Liga. He only missed one game in the league campaign, totalling more than 3,200 minutes of action to help his team finish 13th in the Segunda Liga.

Braga
In June 2013, Silva signed a five-year contract with S.C. Braga for an undisclosed fee. On 10 November he scored his first goals, striking twice in a 3–1 win at S.C. Olhanense in the fourth round of the Taça de Portugal; nineteen days later he scored for the first time in the league, in a 4–1 home win over the same opposition. He finished his first year with 23 appearances and three goals to help to a ninth-place finish.

The following season, Silva was ever-present in the league, starting all but one game. He scored three times in the 2014–15 Taça de Portugal, including one in the final which they lost in a penalty shootout to Sporting CP at the Estádio Nacional on 31 May 2015.

Silva scored the only goal on his UEFA Europa League debut on 17 September 2015 to defeat FC Slovan Liberec away, and added two further goals in a run to the quarter-finals. After a 2015–16 season in which Braga won the cup final against FC Porto, he was coveted by S.L. Benfica.

Benfica
On 1 September 2016, defending champions Benfica announced that Silva had signed a five-year contract with the club, in a deal totalling €16.4 million. His release clause was set at €60 million. He made his debut eight days later, starting in a 2–1 win at F.C. Arouca.

In his 14th game, on 22 January 2017, as a late substitute for Kostas Mitroglou, Silva scored his first goal for the team in a 4–0 win over C.D. Tondela at the Estádio da Luz. In that season, he also played seven minutes in the final of the domestic cup, won after defeating Vitória de Guimarães 2–1.

Silva scored his ninth league goal of 2018–19 on 2 March 2019, in a 2–1 away victory against Porto; Benfica leapfrogged the opposition and took first place with ten rounds remaining. He ended the season with a career-best 17 league goals, bettered only by teammate Haris Seferovic (23 goals) and Bruno Fernandes (20) in the whole division. After the season ended, his contract was renewed until 2024 and its buyout clause increased to €80 million.

On 4 August 2019, Silva scored the opening goal of a 5–0 win for Benfica in the 2019 Supertaça Cândido de Oliveira, against city rivals Sporting at the Estádio Algarve. On 23 October, he scored his first Champions League goal in a 2–1 victory over Lyon. The following 17 January, days after returning from a three-month injury, he scored both goals in a win away to the same team.

On 25 October 2022, he scored a brace in a 4–3 victory over Juventus, which qualified his club to the knockout phase.

International career
Silva made his first appearance for the Portugal under-20 team on 23 April 2013, against Uzbekistan. He was not selected to that year's FIFA U-20 World Cup.

On 28 February 2014, Silva received his first callup for the senior side, for an exhibition game with Cameroon on 5 March. He played the first 45 minutes of the game, in a 5–1 win in Leiria. On 19 May, he was named in the final 23-man squad for the 2014 FIFA World Cup, remaining unused in Brazil as his team were knocked out in the group stage.

After scoring in both games against Azerbaijan in qualification, Silva was part of the under-21 team that finished as runners-up at the 2015 UEFA European Championship in the Czech Republic. He returned to the full side for UEFA Euro 2016, making his only appearance in the competition on 18 June by coming on as an 89th-minute substitute for Nani in a 0–0 draw with Austria at the Parc des Princes.

Silva missed over two years of international football from September 2016 to October 2018, returning against Poland in the UEFA Nations League; he was selected for the final tournament on home soil where he played the final 15 minutes of the 1–0 win over the Netherlands. At UEFA Euro 2020, delayed to 2021, he played two group games off the bench, winning a penalty and assisting Cristiano Ronaldo in a 3–0 win over Hungary.

On 19 September 2022, Silva announced his retirement from international football, citing personal reasons.

Career statistics

Club

Notes

International

Honours
Braga
Taça de Portugal: 2015–16
Supertaça Cândido de Oliveira runner-up: 2016

Benfica
Primeira Liga: 2016–17, 2018–19
Taça de Portugal: 2016–17; runner-up: 2020–21
Supertaça Cândido de Oliveira: 2017, 2019
Portugal
UEFA European Championship: 2016
UEFA Nations League: 2018–19

Orders
 Commander of the Order of Merit

References

External links

Profile at the S.L. Benfica website
National team data 

1993 births
Living people
People from Vila Franca de Xira
Sportspeople from Lisbon District
Portuguese footballers
Association football midfielders
Primeira Liga players
Liga Portugal 2 players
C.D. Feirense players
S.C. Braga players
S.C. Braga B players
S.L. Benfica footballers
Portugal youth international footballers
Portugal under-21 international footballers
Portugal international footballers
2014 FIFA World Cup players
UEFA Euro 2016 players
UEFA Euro 2020 players
UEFA European Championship-winning players
UEFA Nations League-winning players
Commanders of the Order of Merit (Portugal)